The , abbreviated as POMGE, is a multi-purpose arena primarily used as an ice rink, located in Marseille, Bouches-du-Rhône, France. It is the home venue for ice hockey team Spartiates de Marseille. The complex also houses a skate park which, at the time of its opening, was billed as the largest such indoor installation in Europe.
It was inaugurated in 2009, and is popularly known as Patinoire de la Capelette after the Marseille quarter it sits in, la Capelette.

History
Ice availability has historically been an issue in the Marseille metropolitan area, one of the France's three largest agglomerations.

A semi-permanent 56 × 26 metre rink was built at the Parc des Expositions Marseille-Chanot in the wake of the 1968 Grenoble Olympics, which introduced ice sports to the broader French public, but it was dismantled in 1974.

A new ice rink, Patinoire du Rouet, opened the same year inside a repurposed fruit packing plant, but it was severely undersized at 40 × 20 metre. The facility closed in 1984 and no other venue would be active in the area until 1993, when a recreational rink measuring 46 × 20 metre opened on Avenue Jules Cantini. However it closed within two years.

Another rink called Megaglace opened in 1994 near the neighbouring college town of Aix-en-Provence. Built inside an old sanitary ware retail space and measuring 42 × 20 metre, it again fell short of the standards expected from a major agglomeration.
Finally in 1998, a sister facility called Megaglace 2 opened in Aubagne. Although still relatively spartan, it boasted a small stand and a 56 × 26 metre track, in compliance with minimum IIHF regulations.

In March 2004, the municipality of Marseille launched preliminary consultations to give the city a suitable ice sports facility as part of a broader urban rehabilitation plan.
In March 2005, the project presented by architectural firm Chabanne et partenaires was selected. During most of its planning and building phases, it was tentatively known as Palais de la glace et de la glisse de Marseille.

After some delays, the facility was inaugurated on 11 December 2009, under the new name Palais omnisports Marseille Grand-Est. The ceremony was attended by Minister of Sports Roselyne Bachelot-Narquin, and featured an exhibition by former ISU World Champion ice dancers Isabelle Delobel and Olivier Schoenfelder.

Building
The POMGE cost an estimated €48 million to build, with most of the work split between main contractors Gagne Construction Métallique, Chagnaud Construction and SPIE Batignolles/Valérian.

Ice rink
At 5,600 in hockey configuration, the main hall is the largest permanent ice rink in France in terms of spectator capacity, which excludes ice capable entertainment venues such as Paris' Accor Arena, regular home of the ice hockey Coupe de France final. It features an 1800 m2 Olympic size pad.
The second ice rink is a recreational track, and has an unconventional shape consisting of circular areas and elliptical corridors. It has a surface of 1250 m2.

Skate park
In addition to the ice facilities, the Palais offers a 3500 m2 indoor skate park for roller skating, skateboarding and BMX activities. It has a capacity of 750 spectators, extensible to 1500.

Notable events
2010 French Figure Skating Championships
2015 ice hockey Coupe de France Final
2017 ISU Grand Prix Final

References

External links
Official website

Sports venues in Bouches-du-Rhône
Sports venues in Marseille
Marseille
Indoor arenas in France
Indoor ice hockey venues in France
Sports venues completed in 2009
2009 establishments in France
21st-century architecture in France